First Monday in October is a 1981 American comedy-drama film from Paramount Pictures, produced by Paul M. Heller and Martha Scott, directed by Ronald Neame, that is based on the 1978 play of the same name by Jerome Lawrence and Robert Edwin Lee. The film stars Walter Matthau (for which he was nominated for a Golden Globe Award for Best Actor – Motion Picture Musical or Comedy) and Jill Clayburgh (for which she was nominated for a Golden Globe Award for Best Actress – Motion Picture Musical or Comedy). The cast also co-stars Jan Sterling in her final feature film role.

Paramount Pictures originally scheduled First Monday in October for release in February 1982, but President Ronald Reagan's appointment of Sandra Day O'Connor as the first female Supreme Court justice on July 7, 1981, forced the film's release a month after her nomination, in August 1981.

The film's title refers to the day that the Supreme Court commences its annual term, which continues until June or early July of the following year.

Plot
The death of Stanley Moorehead, Associate Justice of the United States Supreme Court, has created a vacancy on the high court. The President's appointee turns out to be Ruth Loomis, a staunch conservative from Orange County, California, who is confirmed as the first female Associate Justice.

She and Associate Justice Daniel Snow, a committed liberal who is many years older than Loomis and with many years on the Supreme Court, clash intellectually on just about every judicial issue before them. One case involves a pornographic film and involves arguments about freedom of speech.

Another is a lawsuit, sent up from the lower court, brought by a company's stockholders regarding the suppression of a possibly revolutionary new power source, a momentum engine. The patent is controlled by the board of directors of Omnitech International, and its CEO Donald Richards, who has not been seen in public for a decade and is unavailable by subpoena.

With time, the two judges develop a liking and respect for each other. They realize this while Snow is recovering in the hospital from a "heart episode" suffered while he and Loomis were debating the complexities of the momentum engine/Omnitech case, after hours, in the courthouse.

Based on something Snow intimated during their debate, Loomis returns to Orange County, overnight. There, in a records storage center, she discovers proof that her late husband and his law firm covered up the death of their client, Donald Richards. Because of her former association with the law firm, she concludes she has a serious conflict of interest on the Omnitech case, and must now resign her Associate Justice position. When Snow hears this, he leaves the hospital abruptly and after more debate, talks her out of resigning. They head by taxi to the Supreme Court to announce her discovery, one that will no doubt shake up the Omnitech case and get it on the docket for the high court to review.

Cast

 Walter Matthau as Associate Justice Daniel Snow
 Jill Clayburgh as Associate Justice Ruth Loomis
 Barnard Hughes as Chief Justice James Jefferson Crawford
 Jan Sterling as Christine Snow
 James Stephens as Mason Woods
 Joshua Bryant as Bill Russell
 Wiley Harker as Associate Justice Harold Webb 
 F.J. O'Neil as Associate Justice Waldo Thompson
 Charles Lampkin as Associate Justice Josiah Clewes
 Lew Palter as Associate Justice Benjamin Halperin
 Richard McMurray as Associate Justice Richard Carey
 Herb Vigran as Associate Justice Ambrose Quincy

Critical response
At the film review aggregator website Rotten Tomatoes, 47% of 975 viewers liked The First Monday in October. The film carries an average rating of 3.1/5.

New York Times critic Janet Maslin opened her review of the film with two questions: “What if the latest Supreme Court Justice were a woman? And what if that woman were a terrible pill?” concisely summarizing her problems with the film, which clearly showed signs of having been rushed to market. She praised Matthau's performance and found fault with the character of Justice Ruth Loomis but pointed to the screenplay as “the main source of difficulty. The authors' idea is to confront a crotchety liberal Justice, Dan Snow, with the sprightly, more conservative Ruth Loomis, and let the sparks fly. However, Mr. Lawrence and Mr. Lee have a way of mistaking hectoring, nagging and all-out nastiness for the stuff of which sparks are made.” Director Ronald Neame came under fire for a variety of errors, including an August scene set with snow and slush and the discordant—to her—casting of  The Paper Chase star James Stephens in a role very similar to his one he played in the television series.

Home video
First Monday in October was first released on DVD by Paramount Home Video on July 6, 2004. No Blu ray release has been announced.

See also
Supreme Court of the United States in fiction

References

External links
 
 

1980s political comedy-drama films
1981 films
American political comedy-drama films
American courtroom films
American films based on plays
Films directed by Ronald Neame
Paramount Pictures films
Films about lawsuits
1980s English-language films
1980s American films